The following is a list of empresses and queens consort of China. China has periodically been divided into kingdoms as well as united under empires, resulting in consorts titled both queen and empress. The empress title could also be given posthumously.

Empresses and queens consort
The title of empress consort (húanghòu) could also be given posthumously. The posthumous empresses are listed separately by the year they were given the title.

Zhou dynasty

Western Han dynasty

Xin dynasty

Eastern Han dynasty
 AD 26–41: Guo Shengtong
 41–57: Empress Yin Lihua
 60–75: Empress Ma
 78–88: Empress Dou
 96–102: Empress Yin
 102–106: Empress Deng Sui
 108–125: Empress Yan Ji
 132–144: Empress Liang Na
 147–159: Empress Liang Nüying
 159–165: Empress Deng Mengnü
 165–168: Empress Dou Miao
 171–178: Empress Song
 180–189: Empress He
 195–214: Empress Fu Shou
 215–220: Empress Cao Jie

Three Kingdoms period

Cao Wei
 222–226: Empress Guo Nüwang
 227–237: Empress Mao
 238–239: Empress Guo
 243–251: Empress Zhen
 252–254: Empress Zhang
 254: Empress Wang
 255–260: Empress Bian
 263–265: Empress Bian

Shu Han
 221–223: Empress Wu
 223–237: Empress Zhang
 238–263: Empress Zhang

Eastern Wu
 251–252: Empress Pan
 252–258: Empress Quan Huijie
 262–264: Empress Zhu
 264–280: Empress Teng Fanglan

Jin dynasty
 265–274: Empress Yang Yan
 276–290: Empress Yang Zhi
 290–300: Empress Jia Nanfeng
 300–301, 301–304, 304, 304–305, 305, 306–307: Yang Xianrong
 307–311: Empress Liang Lanbi
 323–326: Empress Yu Wenjun
 336–341: Empress Du
 342–344: Empress Chu Suanzi
 357–361: Empress He Fani
 361–365: Empress Wang Muzhi
 365–366: Empress Yu Daolian
 375–380: Empress Wang Fahui
 396–403, 404–412: Empress Wang Shen'ai
 419–420: Chu Lingyuan

Huan Chu dynasty
 403–404: Empress Liu

Sixteen Kingdoms period

Cheng Han
 315–334: Empress Ren
 334–338?: Empress Yan
 338–343: Empress Yan
 343–347: Empress Li

Former Zhao
 304–?: Empress Huyan
 310: Empress Dan
 310–312: Empress Huyan
 313: Empress Zhang
 313–314: Empress Liu E
 315–318: Empress Jin Yueguang
 315–318: Left Empress Liu
 315–318: Empress Jin Yuehua
 316–318: Upper Empress Fan
 318: Left Empress Wang
 318: Middle Empress Xuan
 318: Empress Jin
 319–322: Empress Yang
 325–326: Empress Liu
 326–329: Empress Liu

Later Zhao
 330–333: Empress Liu
 337: Zheng Yingtao
 337–348: Du Zhu
 348–349: Empress Liu
 349: Empress Zhang

Ran Wei
 350–352: Empress Dong

Former Liang
 324?-346: Princess Yan
 346?-354: Princess Pei
 354–355: Empress Xin

Later Liang
 389–400: Princess Shi
 400–401: Empress Yang
 401–403: Empress Yang

Western Liang
 Princess Yin

Northern Liang
 401–433: Princess Meng
 433?-437: Princess Li Jingshou
 437–439: Princess Tuoba

Southern Liang
 408–414: Queen Zhejue

Former Qin
 351–355: Empress Qiang
 355: Empress Liang
 357–385: Empress Gou
 385–386: Empress Yang
 387–389: Empress Mao
 392–393: Empress Li

Later Qin
 386–394: Empress She
 402–?: Empress Zhang
 412–?: Empress Qi
 416–417: Yao Hong's empress

Western Qin
 388–394, 394–400, 409–412: Queen Bian
 394: Queen Fu
 414–423: Queen Tufa
 429–431: Queen Liang

Former Yan
 337–348: Princess Duan
 348?–360: Empress Kezuhun
 369–370: Empress Kezuhun

Later Yan
 388–396: Duan Yuanfei
 396–398: Empress Duan
 404–407: Fu Xunying
 407–409: Empress Li

Northern Yan
 409–?: Princess Sun
 430–?: Princess Murong

Southern Yan
 398–405: Duan Jifei
 408–410: Empress Huyan

Xia
 407–425: Empress Kezuhun
 425–427: Helian Chang's empress

Northern and Southern dynasties

Liu Song
 422–424: Empress Sima Maoying
 424–440: Empress Yuan Qigui
 453: Empress Yin Yuying
 453–464: Empress Wang Xianyuan
 465: Empress Lu
 465–472: Empress Wang Zhenfeng
 472–477: Empress Jiang
 478–479: Empress Xie Fanjing

Southern Qi
 493–494: He Jingying
 494: Wang Shaoming
 498–501: Chu Lingqu
 501–502: Wang Shunhua

Northern Wei
 400–409: Empress Murong
 432–452: Empress Helian
 456–465: Empress Feng
 493–497: Empress Feng Qing
 497–499: Empress Feng Run
 501–507: Empress Yu
 508–515: Empress Gao
 5??–528: Empress Hu
 528–530: Empress Erzhu Ying'e
 530–531: Empress Erzhu
 532: Empress Erzhu
 533–534: Empress Gao

Western Wei
 535–538: Empress Yifu
 538–540: Empress Yujiulü
 553–554: Empress Yuwen
 554–556: Empress Ruogan

Eastern Wei
 539–550: Empress Gao

Northern Qi
 550–559: Empress Li Zu'e
 560–561: Empress Yuan
 561–565: Empress Hu
 565–572: Empress Hulü
 572–573: Empress Hu
 572–577: Empress Mu

Liang dynasty
 551: Empress Zhang
 Empress Wang
 560–561: Empress Wang

Chen dynasty
 Zhang Yao'er
 Shen Miaorong
 Wang Shaoji
 Liu Jingyan
 Shen Wuhua

Northern Zhou

 557–557: Empress Yuan Humo
 568–568: Empress Dugu
 568–578: Empress Ashina
 578–579: Yang Lihua
 579–580: Empress Sima Lingji

Sui dynasty
 581–602: Dugu Qieluo, empress consort of Emperor Wen
 605–618: Empress Xiao, empress consort of Emperor Yang

Tang dynasty

 626–636: Empress Zhangsun, empress consort of Emperor Taizong
 650–655: Empress Wang, first empress consort of Emperor Gaozong
 655–684: Wu Zetian, second empress consort of Emperor Gaozong, later also an empress regnant
 684–684: Empress Wei, empress consort of Emperor Zhongzong
 684–690: Empress Liu, empress consort of Emperor Ruizong
 705–710: Empress Wei (second time), empress consort of Emperor Zhongzong
 710–710: Empress Lu, empress consort of Emperor Shang
 712–724: Empress Wang, empress consort of Emperor Xuanzong
 758–762: Empress Zhang, empress consort of Emperor Suzong
 786–786: Empress Wang, empress consort of Emperor Dezong
 898–900: Empress He, empress consort of Emperor Zhaozong
 901–904: Empress He (second time), empress consort of Emperor Zhaozong
Qin
 Empress Ju
Han (Dingyang)
 Empress Ju
Xia
 Empress Cao
Yan
 Empress Duan
 Empress Xin
Qi
 Empress Cao

Five Dynasties and Ten Kingdoms period

Qi
 907–924: Empress Liu, empress consort of Li Maozhen

Former Shu
 908–918: Empress Zhou, empress consort of Wang Jian
 918–921: Empress Gao, first empress consort of Wang Zongyan
 921–926: Empress Jin Feishan, second empress consort of Wang Yan

Yan
 911–913: Empress Li and Empress Zhu, empress consorts of Liu Shouguang

Later Liang
 912–913: Empress Zhang, empress consort of Zhu Yougui

Southern Han
 919–935: Empress Ma, empress consort of Liu Yan

Later Tang
 924–926: Empress Liu, empress consort of Li Cunxu
 930–933: Empress Cao, empress consort of Li Siyuan
 934–934: Empress Kong, empress consort of Li Conghou
 934–936: Empress Liu, empress consort of Li Congke

Wu
 933–937: Empress Wang, empress consort of Yang Pu

Min
 935–935: Empress Chen Jinfeng, empress consort of Wang Yanjun
 936–939: Empress Li Chunyan, empress consort of Wang Jipeng
 942–944: Empress Li, empress consort of Wang Yanxi

Southern Tang
 937–943: Empress Song, empress consort of Li Bian
 943–961: Empress Zhong, empress consort of Li Jing
 961–965: Queen Zhou the Elder, first queen consort of Li Yu
 968–975: Queen Zhou the Younger, second queen consort of Li Yu

Later Jin
 941–942: Empress Li, empress consort of Shi Jingtang
 943–946: Empress Feng, empress consort of Shi Chonggui

Yin
 943–?: Empress Zhang, empress consort of Wang Yanzheng

Later Han
 947–948: Empress Li, empress consort of Liu Zhiyuan

Later Zhou
 954–956: Empress Fu the Elder, first empress consort of Chai Rong
 959–959: Empress Dowager Fu (Later Zhou), second empress consort of Chai Rong

Northern Han
 ?–968: Empress Guo, empress consort of Liu Jun
 968–?: Empress Ma, empress consort of Liu Jiyuan

Song dynasty

 960–963: Empress Wang, first empress consort of Emperor Taizu
 968–976: Empress Song, second empress consort of Emperor Taizu
 984–997: Empress Li, empress consort of Emperor Taizong
 997–1007: Empress Guo, first empress consort of Emperor Zhenzong
 1012–1022: Empress Liu, second empress consort of Emperor Zhenzong and Senior regent Song dynasty 
 1024–1033: Empress Guo, first empress consort of Emperor Renzong
 1034–1063: Empress Cao, second empress consort of Emperor Renzong
 1065–1067: Empress Gao, empress consort of Emperor Yingzong
 1068–1085: Empress Xiang, empress consort of Emperor Shenzong
 1092–1096: Empress Meng, first empress consort of Emperor Zhezong
 1099–1100: Empress Liu, second empress consort of Emperor Zhezong
 1100–1108: Empress Wang, first empress consort of Emperor Huizong 
 1111–1126: Empress Zheng, second empress consort of Emperor Huizong
 1126–1127: Empress Zhu, empress consort of Emperor Qinzong
 1127–1139: Empress Xing, first empress consort of Emperor Gaozong
 1143–1162: Empress Wu, second empress consort of Emperor Gaozong
 1162–1167: Empress Xia, first empress consort of Emperor Xiaozong
 1167–1189: Empress Xie, second empress consort of Emperor Xiaozong
 1189–1194: Empress Li Fengniang, empress consort of Emperor Guangzong
 1194–1200: Empress Han, first empress consort of Emperor Ningzong
 1200–1224: Empress Yang, second empress consort of Emperor Ningzong
 1227–1264: Empress Xie Daoqing, empress consort of Emperor Lizong
 1267–1274: Empress Quan, empress consort of Emperor Duzong

Yuan dynasty

 1260–1281: Chabi, first empress consort of Emperor Shizu
 1283–1294: Nambui, second empress consort of Emperor Shizu
 1295–1307: Bulugan, empress consort of Emperor Chengzong
 1310–1311: Zhenge, empress consort of Emperor Wuzong
 1313–1320: Radnashiri, empress consort of Emperor Renzong
 1321–1323: Sugabala, empress consort of Emperor Yingzong
 1324–1328: Babukhan Khatun, empress consort of Emperor Taiding
 1328–1329: Budashiri, empress consort of Emperor Wenzong
 1329–1329: Babusha, empress consort of Emperor Mingzong
 1329–1332: Budashiri (second time), empress consort of Emperor Wenzong
 1332–1332: Daliyetemishi, empress consort of Emperor Ningzong
 1333–1335: Danashri, first empress consort of Emperor Huizong
 1337–1365: Bayan Khutugh, second empress consort of Emperor Huizong
 1340–1370: Empress Gi, third empress consort of Emperor Huizong

Ming dynasty

 1368–1382: Empress Ma, empress consort of the Hongwu Emperor
 1399–1402: Empress Ma, empress consort of the Jianwen Emperor
 1402–1407: Empress Xu, empress consort of the Yongle Emperor
 1424–1425: Empress Zhang, empress consort of the Hongxi Emperor
 1425–1428: Empress Hu Shanxiang, first empress consort of the Xuande Emperor
 1428–1435: Empress Sun, second empress consort of the Xuande Emperor
 1442–1449: Empress Qian, empress consort of the Zhengtong Emperor
 1449–1452: Empress Wang, first empress consort of the Jingtai Emperor
 1452–1456: Empress Hang, second empress consort of the Jingtai Emperor
 1457–1464: Empress Qian (second time), empress consort of the Tianshun Emperor (former Zhengtong Emperor)
 1464–1464: Empress Wu, first empress consort of the Chenghua Emperor
 1464–1487: Empress Wang, second empress consort of the Chenghua Emperor
 1487–1505: Empress Zhang, empress consort of the Hongzhi Emperor
 1506–1521: Empress Xia, empress consort of the Zhengde Emperor
 1522–1528: Empress Chen, first empress consort of the Jiajing Emperor
 1528–1534: Empress Zhang, second empress consort of the Jiajing Emperor
 1534–1547: Empress Fang, third empress consort of the Jiajing Emperor
 1566–1572: Empress Chen, empress consort of the Longqing Emperor
 1578–1620: Empress Wang Xijie, empress consort of the Wanli Emperor
 1621–1627: Empress Zhang, empress consort of the Tianqi Emperor
 1628–1644: Empress Zhou, empress consort of the Chongzhen Emperor

Southern Ming
 1645–1646: Empress Zeng, empress consort of the Longwu Emperor
 1646–1662: Empress Wang, empress consort of the Yongli Emperor

Qing dynasty

Manchukuo

Empresses dowager
The title of Empress dowager (húangtàihòu) was automatically given to a former Empress consort and widow of an Emperor. The title, Empress dowager, could be granted a widow of an Emperor even when she had not been the Empress consort during the reign of her spouse. Therefore, a separate list is given of the Empresses dowager, which, in some cases, equals the list of Empresses consort, and in other cases, not.

Han dynasty
Empress Dowager Lü
Empress Dowager Bo
Empress Dowager Dou
Empress Dowager Wang
Empress Dowager Shangguan
Empress Dowager Wang
Empress Dowager Wang
Empress Dowager Zhao
Grand Empress Dowager Fu
Empress Dowager Ding
Empress Dowager Wang
Empress Dowager Yin
Empress Dowager Ma
Empress Dowager Dou
Empress Dowager Deng
Empress Dowager Yan
Empress Dowager Liang
Empress Dowager Dou
Empress Dowager He

Northern Dynasties

Northern Wei
Princess Dowager Helan
Empress Dowager Helian
Nurse empress dowager
Empress Dowager Feng(Empress Dowager Wenming)
Empress Dowager Gao
Empress Dowager Hu

Tang dynasty
 683–690: Empress Dowager Wu
 710: Empress Dowager Wei
 805–816: Empress Dowager Wang
 820–848: Empress Dowager Guo
 824–845: Empress Dowager Wang
 826–847: Empress Dowager Xiao
 846–865: Empress Dowager Zheng
 904–906: Empress Dowager He

Song dynasty
Empress Dowager Du
Empress Dowager Li
Empress Dowager Liu
Empress Dowager Yang
Empress Dowager Cao
Empress Dowager Gao
Empress Dowager Xiang
Empress Dowager Meng
Empress Dowager Liu
Empress Dowager Wei
Empress Dowager Wu
Empress Dowager Xie
Empress Dowager Li
Empress Dowager Yang
Empress Dowager Xie
Empress Dowager Quan
Empress Dowager Yang

Yuan dynasty
Empress Dowager Khongirad
Empress Dowager Naimans
Empress Dowager Oirats
Empress Dowager Khongirad
Empress Dowager Khongirad
Empress Dowager Khongirad
Empress Dowager Khongirad 
Empress Dowager Khongirad

Ming dynasty
Empress Dowager Lü
Empress Dowager Zhang
Empress Dowager Hu
Empress Dowager Sun
Empress Dowager Wu
Empress Dowager Qian
Empress Dowager Zhou
Empress Dowager Wang
Empress Dowager Zhang
Empress Dowager Shao
Empress Dowager Jiang
Empress Dowager Chen
Empress Dowager Li
Empress Dowager Zou
Empress Dowager Ma
Empress Dowager Wang

Qing dynasty

 1643–1649: Empress Xiaoduanwen
 1643–1688: Empress Dowager Zhaosheng
 1661–1663: Empress Dowager Cihe
 1661–1718: Empress Dowager Renxian
 1722–1723: Empress Dowager Renshou
 1735–1777: Empress Dowager Chongqing
 1820–1850: Empress Dowager Gongci
 1855: Empress Dowager Kangci
 1861–1881: Empress Dowager Ci'an
 1861–1908: Empress Dowager Cixi
 1908–1913: Empress Dowager Longyu

Grand empresses dowager

Empresses whose titles were granted posthumously

Sui dynasty
 581: Empress Lü Gutao, mother of Emperor Wen of Sui

Tang dynasty
 618: Empress Dugu (Empress Yuanzhen, mother of Emperor Gaozu of Tang)
 618: Duchess Dou (Empress Taimu), wife of Li Yuan, Emperor Gaozu of Tang before Li Yuan's ascension

Song dynasty
 961: Empress Dowager Du, mother of Emperor Taizu and Emperor Taizong
 960: Empress He, married to Emperor Taizu
 976: Empress Yin, married to Emperor Taizong
 976: Empress Fu, married to Emperor Taizong
 997: Empress Li, mother of Emperor Zhenzong
 997: Princess Pan, married to Emperor Zhenzong
 1033: Consort Li, mother of Emperor Renzong 
 1036: Empress Yang, married to Emperor Zhenzong
 1054: Empress Zhang, married to Emperor Renzong
 1101: Empress Chen, mother of Emperor Huizong
 1102: Empress Zhu, mother of Emperor Zhezong
 1113: Empress Mingda, married to Emperor Huizong
 1121: Empress Mingzhe, married to Emperor Huizong
 1159: Empress Xianren, mother of Emperor Gaozong
 1162: Empress Chengmu, married to Emperor Xiaozong

Yuan dynasty
 1336: Mailaiti, mother of Emperor Huizong

Ming dynasty and Southern Ming dynasty
 1504: Empress Xiaosu, mother of the Chenghua Emperor
 1566: Empress Xiaoke, mother of the Longqing Emperor
 1566: Empress Xiaoyizhuan, married to the Longqing Emperor
 1614: Empress Xiaoding, mother of the Wanli Emperor
 1620: Empress Xiaojing, mother of the Taichang Emperor
 1644: Empress Xiaozhejian
 1644: Empress Xiaoyi
 1644: Empress Xiaoxu

Qing dynasty

 1626: Empress Xiaoliewu, married to Nurhaci
 1636: Empress Xiaocigao, mother of Hong Taiji
 1660: Consort Donggo, married to the Shunzhi Emperor
 1663: Empress Xiaokangzhang, mother of the Kangxi Emperor
 1723: Empress Xiaogongren, mother of the Yongzheng Emperor
 1777: Empress Xiaoshengxian, mother of the Qianlong Emperor
 1796: Empress Xiaoyichun, mother of the Jiaqing Emperor
 1820: Empress Xiaomucheng, married to the Daoguang Emperor
 1850: Empress Xiaodexian, married to the Xianfeng Emperor
 1855: Empress Xiaojingcheng, married to the Daoguang Emperor

See also 
 Chinese nobility
 Ranks of imperial consorts in China
 Imperial consorts of Tang China
 Grand empress dowager
 Empress dowager
 Nurse empress dowager
 Consort clan
 List of Chinese monarchs

References

Political history of China
Consorts
Chinese